Allen Hutchinson (8 January 1855 – 28 July 1929 London) was an English sculptor.

Hutchinson was born in Staffordshire, England.  He trained in London under Édouard Lantéri. He travelled to Canada and California in 1886.  In 1888, he moved to Hawaii, where he modeled busts of King Kalākaua, Robert Louis Stevenson, and president of the Republic of Hawaii Sanford B. Dole.  While in Hawaii, Hutchinson married, and the couple had a daughter.  In 1894, he was one of the founders of the Kilohana Art League. In 1899, Hutchinson and his family left Hawaii for Australia and New Zealand.  He returned to the United States in 1902, and moved back to London in 1928.  He died in London on 28 July 1929.

The Beinecke Rare Book and Manuscript Library (Yale University), the Bishop Museum (Honolulu), the Honolulu Museum of Art, the San Diego Historical Society, Stevenson Society of America and the Art Gallery of New South Wales (Sydney) are among the public collections holding sculptures by Allen Hutchinson.

References
 Dunn, Michael, New Zealand Sculpture: a History, Auckland University Press, 2002, p 36–37.
 Falk, Peter Hastings (Editor) Who Was Who in American Art, 1564–1975, New Providence, NJ, Marquis Who's Who, 1999.
 Fielding, Mantle & Glenn B. Opitz (Editor), Dictionary of American Painters, Sculptors & Engravers, Poughkeepsie, NY, Apollo, 1986.
 Kamerling, Bruce, "Early Sculpture and Sculptors in San Diego" in The Journal of San Diego History, Summer 1989, Volume 35, Number 3.
 Severson, Don R. Finding Paradise: Island Art in Private Collections, University of Hawaii Press, 2002, p. 210–211.

External links
 Allen Hutchinson in AskArt.com
 Hutchinson's bronze bust of artist Gottfried Lindauer, Auckland Art Gallery
 Smithsonian American Art Museum, Art Inventories Catalog

Footnotes

Artists from Hawaii
English sculptors
English male sculptors
1855 births
1929 deaths
20th-century British sculptors
19th-century British sculptors
19th-century British male artists